Small Planet Airlines Cambodia  was an airline based at Siem Reap International Airport. It was a subsidiary of the now defunct Small Planet Airlines from Lithuania.

History
Small Planet Airlines Cambodia is the name of Small Planet Group's Cambodian subsidiary, created as a joint-venture to reduce the effects of seasonality on its business that offers holiday charters through its European bases. In October 2017 Small Planet was granted an air operator's certificate by the Cambodia State Secretariat of Civil Aviation (SSCA) to establish a carrier based at Siem Reap. Small Planet Airlines Cambodia planned to operate leisure flights from Siem Reap to destinations in South Korea and China with plans for further Asian countries, including Thailand and Japan. It commenced operations on 30 November 2017 with its first flight from the capital Phnom Penh to Siem Reap.

In November 2018 the airline temporarily suspended operations due to financial difficulties. In the weeks prior, its sister companies in Poland and Germany also ceased operations for the same reason.

Destinations

The airline operated regular service from its base at Siem Reap International Airport to Phnom Penh and Preah Sihanouk.

Fleet
As of October 2018, Small Planet Airlines Cambodia operated the following fleet:

See also
 Transport in Cambodia
 List of airlines of Cambodia

References

External links
 Official website

Defunct airlines of Cambodia
Airlines established in 2017
Airlines disestablished in 2018
2018 disestablishments in Cambodia
Cambodian companies established in 2017
Defunct charter airlines